James Pountney, better known by his stage name Culture Shock, is a British drum and bass DJ and record producer.

Biography 

In 1996, Culture Shock was introduced to drum and bass while listening to London's pirate radio stations. He set up his own studio with basic equipment at home and recorded his own music. His first release was "The Vega EP" on Moving Shadow in 2004. Two years later, Culture Shock signed with RAM Records after attracting attention of the label's CEO, Andy C. His first EP, titled "The Third Stage" was released in 2007 and featured four tracks, including the track "Rework", co-produced by the Brookes Brothers.

After a longer break, he returned in September 2014 with a remix of Moko's "Your Love" and the songs "Troglodyte VIP" and "Raindrops". His song "City Lights", which has featured as an instrumental in his DJ sets since 2009, was picked up by Virgin EMI Records and released in May 2015 with a vocal by Bryn Christopher of I See MONSTAS. The single has received airplay on popular UK radio stations and music channels, and was BBC Radio 1's Track of the Day. In November/December 2015, he released tracks from his latest extended play entitled Transit.

Discography

Compilations

Extended plays

Singles

Other appearances

Production credits

Remixes

References

External links 
 
 Artist info at RAM Records
 
 

English DJs
English record producers
English drum and bass musicians
Living people
Year of birth missing (living people)
Place of birth missing (living people)
Electronic dance music DJs
RAM Records artists